Giovanni Grixti is a Maltese judge.

See also 
Judiciary of Malta

References 

Living people
20th-century Maltese judges
21st-century Maltese judges
Year of birth missing (living people)
Place of birth missing (living people)